The Buru friarbird or black-faced friarbird (Philemon moluccensis) is a species of bird in the family Meliphagidae.
It is endemic to the island of Buru in the Maluku Islands, Indonesia.

Its natural habitats are subtropical or tropical moist lowland forests and subtropical or tropical moist montane forests.

References

Buru friarbird
Birds of Buru
Buru friarbird
Buru friarbird
Taxonomy articles created by Polbot